Minneopa may refer to:

Minneopa State Park, a state park in Minnesota in the United States
, a United States Navy patrol boat in service from 1917 to 1918